Dean Byrne, (born 11 September 1984 in Crumlin, Dublin, Ireland) is an Irish professional boxer who fights in the light welterweight class.

Amateur career
Byrne, nicknamed "Irish Lightning", had vast experience boxing as an amateur fighting out of Crumlin ABC and during his 200 amateur fights he became Irish national intermediate light welterweight champion also represented Ireland at international level.

Professional career
Following the Irish senior championships, Byrne then emigrated to Australia where he then turned professional and had his first pro fight in February 2006.

Dean's unbeaten streak lasted until 28 October 2011. When, just 8 days after winning a Unanimous decision over Michael Frontin, Byrne took a major step up in class facing France's IBF International Light-Middleweight Champion, Frank Haroche Horta (then 26–8). An unprepared Byrne was outboxed up until the 8th round when his corner retired him due to an injury to his right hand.

Exactly six months later, Byrne fought the then 5–0 unbeaten Terry Holmes of England, and lost a narrow points decision over 8 rounds. Byrne had a comeback fight against Kevin McAuley winning a points decision over four rounds.

On 8 December 2012 Byrne stepped in on a week's notice as a late replacement to fight American contender Carson Jones after Lee Purdy pulled out of the fight due to having caught a virus. Byrne was supposed to be an easy win for Jones who was just recently coming off a majority decision loss to Britain's hard-punching golden boy Kell Brook, but Byrne managed to battle Jones to a draw.

Professional boxing record 

| style="text-align:center;" colspan="8"|18 Wins (6 KOs), 6 Loss, 2 Draw
|-  style="text-align:center; background:#e3e3e3;"
|  style="border-style:none none solid solid; "|Res.
|  style="border-style:none none solid solid; "|Record
|  style="border-style:none none solid solid; "|Opponent
|  style="border-style:none none solid solid; "|Type
|  style="border-style:none none solid solid; "|Round
|  style="border-style:none none solid solid; "|Date
|  style="border-style:none none solid solid; "|Location
|  style="border-style:none none solid solid; "|Notes
|- align=center
|Win
|18–6–1
|align=left| Jamie Robinson
|
|
|
|align=left|
|
|- align=center
|Loss
|17–6–1
|align=left| Peter McDonagh
|
|
|
|align=left|
|
|- align=center
|Loss
|17–5–1
|align=left| David Avanesyan
|
|
|
|align=left|
|
|- align=center
|style="background:#abcdef;"|Draw
|17–4–1
|align=left| William Warburton
|
|
|
|align=left|
|
|- align=center
|Loss
|17–4
|align=left| Mark Douglas
|
|
|
|align=left|
|
|- align=center
|Loss
|17–3
|align=left| Roman Belaev
|
|
|
|align=left|
|
|- align=center
|Win
|17–2
|align=left| Danny Little
|
|
|
|align=left|
|
|- align=center
|style="background:#abcdef;"|Draw
|16–2
|align=left| Carson Jones
|
|
|
|align=left|
|
|- align=center
|Win
|16–2
|align=left| Kevin McAuley
|
|
|
|align=left|
|
|- align=center
|Loss
|15–2
|align=left| Terry Holmes
|
|
|
|align=left|
|
|- align=center
|Loss
|15–1
|align=left| Frank Haroche Horta
|
|
|
|align=left|
|
|- align=center
|Win
|15–0
|align=left| Michael Frontin
|
|
|
|align=left|
|
|- align=center
|Win
|14–0
|align=left| Sergejs Volodins
|
|
|
|align=left|
|
|- align=center
|Win
|13–0
|align=left| Konstantis Sakara
|
|
|
|align=left|
|
|- align=center
|Win
|12–0
|align=left| Justo Sanchez
|
|
|
|align=left|
|
|- align=center
|Win
|11–0
|align=left| Jose reynoso
|
|
|
|align=left|
|
|- align=center
|Win
|10–0
|align=left| Francisco Rios Gil
|
|
|
|align=left|
|
|- align=center
|Win
|9–0
|align=left| Geoffrey Spruiell
|
|
|
|align=left|
|
|- align=center
|Win
|8–0
|align=left| Daniel Gonzales
|
|
|
|align=left|
|
|- align=center
|Win
|7–0
|align=left| Michaelangelo Lynks
|
|
|
|align=left|
|
|- align=center
|Win
|6–0
|align=left| Brad Crookey
|
|
|
|align=left|
|
|- align=center
|Win
|5–0
|align=left| Chris McCullen
|
|
|
|align=left|
|
|- align=center
|Win
|4–0
|align=left| Arnel Porras
|
|
|
|align=left|
|
|- align=center
|Win
|3–0
|align=left| Roberto Oyan
|
|
|
|align=left|
|
|- align=center
|Win
|2–0
|align=left| Roberto Oyan
|
|
|
|align=left|
|
|- align=center
|Win
|1–0
|align=left| Ronnie Oyan
|
|
|
|align=left|
|

References

External links
 

1984 births
Living people
Irish expatriates in the United States
Irish male boxers
Light-welterweight boxers